(), formerly Western Isles, is a constituency of the House of Commons of the Parliament of the United Kingdom, created in 1918.  It elects one Member of Parliament (MP) by the first past the post system of election.

With around 21,000 registered voters, it has the smallest electorate of any constituency in the United Kingdom. It is expressly protected from being combined with other constituencies by the 2011 Parliamentary Voting System and Constituencies Act.

History 
The constituency was formed by merging areas which were formerly within the Ross and Cromarty constituency and the Inverness-shire constituency.

An identical constituency with the same name is used by the Scottish Parliament.

Boundaries 
However, the Isle of Wight is a substantially smaller parliamentary constituency in geographical terms. It has been suggested that Na h-Eileanan an Iar could be combined with the Orkney and Shetland constituency: the resulting combined electorate would still be well below the average constituency quota. The seat's entire turnout at elections will be less than a winning candidate's vote in a rural English seat.

The Scottish Boundary Commission in 1980 proposed that the seat should be extended to include the Skye and Lochalsh areas; this was overturned at a public enquiry. Generally, considerations of geographical size, a disparate population and convenience for the MPs concerned, as well as tradition and identity, have tended to override the arguments about numerical imbalance. Furthermore, a change in the Boundary Commission's rules in 2000 added a rule which forbade Orkney or Shetland being combined with another council area. In 2011, the Parliamentary Voting System and Constituencies Act 2011 was introduced, which prevented both Na h-Eileanan an Iar and Orkney and Shetland from being combined with any other constituency.

Local government areas 

When created, the area of the constituency was divided between two local government areas: the counties of Ross and Cromarty and Inverness-shire. The division line was the Lewis-Harris boundary, with Lewis in Ross and Cromarty and Harris in Inverness-shire.

In 1975 the constituency area became also an island council area, known as the Western Isles council area. That same area became one of the 32 unitary council areas of Scotland in 1996. The council area is known also as Na h-Eileanan Siar.

Politics 
The seat had been a two-way marginal between the Labour Party and the Scottish National Party for many years. In 2005 it became a safe seat for the Scottish National Party. This trend was reversed in the 2017 general election, when the SNP suffered a swing against them for the first time since 1997, but at the 2019 general election the constituency became a safe seat for the SNP again. For the Conservatives, their vote has increased in recent years, since losing their deposit in the 2005 and 2010 elections.

During the 2014 Scottish independence referendum the constituency voted against independence by a margin of 53.42% (10,544) to 46.58% (9,195) in favour on a turnout of 86.2%

The constituency is notable for having the highest percentage of Scottish Gaelic speakers of any Scottish constituency.

Members of Parliament

Election results

Elections of the 2010s

Elections of the 2000s

Elections of the 1990s

Elections of the 1980s

Elections of the 1970s

Elections of the 1960s

Elections of the 1950s

Elections of the 1940s

Elections of the 1930s

Elections of the 1920s

Elections of the 1910s

References

Constituencies of the Parliament of the United Kingdom established in 1918
Westminster Parliamentary constituencies in Scotland
Politics of the county of Inverness
Politics of the county of Ross and Cromarty